Stratford is a rural locality in the Mid-Coast Council local government area in the Hunter Region of New South Wales, Australia. Stratford, which is next to the Avon River, is on Bucketts Way,  from the Pacific Highway, the nearest major highway.

At the 2006 census, the village of Stratford had a population of 110. The village has a park with cricket pitch and play-gym, a New South Wales Rural Fire Service shed, shop with petroleum, hall, church, public school and the Stratford lawn cemetery. The village is located on one of the main access routes to the Barrington Tops National Park.

The principal industries of the area include mining, beef cattle breeding and dairying. The nearby Stratford coal mine transports coal to Newcastle for export or the New South Wales Power Stations.

Notes

  This population figure is for the village only. The Australian Bureau of Statistics data for Stratford does not include the entire suburb.

References

Suburbs of Mid-Coast Council
Towns in the Hunter Region